Jamesia is a genus of shrubs in the Hydrangeaceae, most commonly known as Jamesia, cliffbush or waxflower. It is native to interior western North America, in the U.S. states of Arizona, California, Colorado, Nevada, New Mexico, Utah, and Wyoming, growing in mountains at 1600–3000 m altitude.

There are just two species in the genus, Jamesia americana, and Jamesia tetrapetala.

It is a shrub growing to 1–2 m tall and to 3 m or more broad, with opposite simple leaves 3–7 cm long and 2–5 cm broad, with a serrated margin and a crinkled surface. The flowers are produced in  erect terminal panicles, each flower white, 15–20 mm diameter, with five (rarely four) petals. The fruit is a dry capsule with numerous small seeds.

The genus is named in honor of Edwin James, the botanist on Stephen Long's expedition in 1820 that explored the territory between the Platte and Arkansas Rivers. James was the first to collect this genus for botanical study.

Notes

References

External links

Photo gallery

Hydrangeaceae
Flora of the Southwestern United States
Flora of North America
Cornales genera